Frans Sammut (19 November 1945 – 4 May 2011) was a Maltese novelist and non-fiction writer.

Personal life and Education

Sammut was born in Zebbug, Malta.  He was married to Catherine née Cachia, with whom he had two sons, Mark and Jean-Pierre. His granddaughter, Katrine Sammut, is a Latvian author, who wrote Pino un Maksis vieni mājās.

Sammut studied at the Zebbug Primary School, St Aloysius' College, St Michael's Teacher Training College, the University of Malta (B.A., S.Th.Dip./Diploma in Sacred Theology, M.Ed.) and Perugia University (Diploma to teach Italian abroad).

Career
Sammut first gained recognition in the early 60s when he was still in his mid-teens through his short story "L-Istqarrija," which won first place in a contest by Għaqda Kittieba Zgħazagħ, and through two other short stories which won second and fourth places in the same contest; then in the late 1960s, he co-founded the Moviment Qawmien Letterarju (Literary Revival Movement). Later he served as Secretary of the Akkademja tal-Malti (Maltese Language Academy).

In 2010, he was elected Fellow of the International Napoleonic Society.

Sammut ended his career in education as a Head of School, though from 1996 to 1998 he was Cultural Consultant to the Prime Minister of Malta.

He published numerous works, including the best-selling novels Il-Gaġġa (The Cage), which was the basis of Gaġġa the 1971 film directed by Mario Philip Azzopardi, Samuraj, which won the Rothmans Prize, Paceville, which won the Government's Literary Medal. and Il-Holma Maltija (The Maltese Dream), about which literary critic Norbert Ellul-Vincenti wrote, "there is nothing of its magnitude in Maltese literature." Former Prime Minister and playwright Alfred Sant considered it Sammut's "masterpiece", and British author and poet Marjorie Boulton called it "a colossal work".

Sammut also published collections of short stories: Labirint (Labyrinth), Newbiet (Seasons), and Hrejjef Zminijietna (Tales of Our Times).

His non-fiction works include Ir-Rivoluzzjoni Franciza: il-Grajja u t-Tifsira (The French Revolution: History and Meaning), Bonaparti f'Malta (Bonaparte in Malta), of which a French translation, Bonaparte à Malte, was published in 2008, and On The Da Vinci Code (2006), a bilingual (English and Maltese) commentary on the international bestseller. He also edited Mikiel Anton Vassalli's Lexicon. Vassalli (d. 1829) is considered the Father of the Maltese Language. In 2006, Sammut's translation of Vassalli's Motti, Aforismi e Proverbii Maltesi was published as Ghajdun il-Ghaqal, Kliem il-Gherf u Qwiel Maltin. In 2007, his Il-Holma Maltija in translation (as La Malta Revo) represented Malta in the Esperanto collection of classic literary works published by Mondial Books of New York. In 2008, his Il-Gagga was published for the fifth time. In 2009, Sammut presented a revolutionary reinterpretation of Pietru Caxaro's poem "Xidew il-qada" (also known as "Il Cantilena"), the oldest written document in the Maltese language.

Sammut translated important works for theatre: Racine's Phedre (Fedra) (1978) and Maxim Gorki's The Lower Depths, both represented at the Manoel Theatre, under the direction of poet Mario Azzopardi.

Former University of Malta Rector and Professor of Philosophy Peter Serracino Inglott said:
The genius of Sammut was in his ability as of a Voltairian jester to transform a historical character into a sort of carnivalesque vector of an ironically larger than life mask. The reader is made to enjoy the obverse side of personalities usually regarded with unmitigated solemnity. One smiles like an accomplice in their doubts, slippings and tergiversations. The stylistic shift from historical narrative to fictional is perhaps the biggest challenge to be faced by any kind of translator.

Professor Henry Frendo said this of Frans Sammut:
Warm and forthright, a worthy son of Ħaż-Żebbuġ, an ardent Francophile, and a potentially acid polemicist in his own right, a patriot, passionate as always, Frans had a command of English as much as of Maltese and he did not hold back any punches if he felt that he or someone else was being wronged.

Former Ambassador to Malta Daniel Rondeau thus described Frans Sammut:
White-haired, with big eyes and white, thick mustaches, quite dark, a strong handshake, the author of Bonaparte à Malte.

Death
Frans Sammut's famous last words were: “My wife and I should be going to Jerusalem, but it seems plans have changed. I am now going to the Heavenly Jerusalem."

Serracino Inglott reacted thus to these words: "I realised then that sometimes tears and laughter are interchangeable."

National Prize
In May 2014, the Maltese Ministry of Education launched the Frans Sammut Prize for the Maltese Language.

University textbooks

Frans Sammut's novels are studied at the University of Malta.

Numerous theses and papers have been written about his novels.

In 2015, university lecturer in literary Dr Marco Galea wrote that the Maltese novel is dominated by Frans Sammut and two others:
In the case of fiction, the situation is not so straightforward. Immanuel Mifsud, together with the younger Clare Azzopardi, Pierre J. Meilak and Walid Nabhan, have produced ground-breaking works of short fiction, but have so far shied away from tackling the novel. Offerings from other writers in this genre have been few and far between. The upshot is a curious situation where contemporary prose writing in Maltese is dominated by the short form, while the novel continues to be dominated by figures such as Frans Sammut (another member of the Moviment, who died in 2011), Alfred Sant and Trevor Żahra.

Critical Acclaim

Marie Benoit The Malta Independent 05.05.2011:
What always struck me about Frans is his lack of intellectual pretension. He carried his considerable learning and extensive knowledge, especially of French history, so lightly. The greatest surprise was what lay behind the smiling façade which gave little evidence of his well-stocked mind.

Hon. Dr Stefan Buontempo (Minister for Local Government, Malta) The Malta Independent 05.05.2011: ... what a giant of Maltese literature he was ...

Joe Felice Pace The Sunday Times 22.05.2011: ... his mastery of the language and his inborn call to be a novelist ...

Charles Flores Malta Today 08.05.2011: More than anything Frans couldn't stand hypocrisy ... He always had that quality ... he could see through you ... He never rested on his laurels – intellectually speaking – and always sought to learn new things and develop his viewpoints.

Dr Adrian Grima Malta Today 08.05.2011: He will be remembered for the unyielding sensuality of his literary prose in Newbiet, the incorrigible egocentrism and machismo of some of his male characters, his unforgiving portrayal of the repressed puritan Sa Rożann, the deep anguish that lacerates Samwel, the harshness of Xandru the Poet violating the sacredness of the parish priest's desk, the intuitions, ideals and sheer beauty of the language of Vassalli, the memorable opening scene of his novel Samuraj, and its denouement.

Partit Laburista maltastar.com 04.05.2011: Malta lost its modern national author. Labour MP Owen Bonnici described Frans Sammut as having earned for himself this title because of his stature in Maltese literature.

Partit Nazzjonalista maltarightnow.com 04.05.2011: The PN saluted Sammut describing him as a pillar of [Maltese] literature whose legacy will be enjoyed by entire generations.

Lino Spiteri The Sunday Times 08.05.2011: The untimely death of Frans Sammut has deprived Malta of one of its greatest men of letters. He was a vivid, robust character who lit up wherever he was active. Whether engaged in civil exchange of ideas or in heated debate, he always stood out as an electrifying personality. He was an intellectual in the true sense of the word, never at peace, always questioning, probing, researching, challenging ... the novel Il-Gaġġa ... has become an all-time classic.

Ġużè Stagno Malta Today 08.05.2011: I'd once heard him say that he had changed his name from ‘Frank’ to ‘Frans’ in a fit of patriotism. ... Sammut gave us Il-Gaġġa, one of the greatest Maltese novels of all time.

Dr Mario Vella The Times 09.05.2011: Mr Sammut[’s] first novel – certainly a milestone in Maltese literature ...

Alex Vella Gera Malta Today 08.05.2011: I was immediately drawn to him, his presence, his sense of humour, and his extensive knowledge not only of the Maltese language but of its history ...

Anton Azzopardi Żebbuġ Business Association Newsletter 12.2011: Even a casual conversation about his pet dog, Skipette, would elicit a glitter in his eyes that would be strongly accentuated by body gestures reminiscent of the best conductors the world stages can throw at us. Frans was open and sincere, if equally argumentative ... Thank you Frans, for having been exactly what you were: larger than life.

Bibliography
 Labirint u Stejjer Oħra [Labyrinth and Other Stories] (short stories) 1968 
 Il-Gaġġa [The Cage] 5 editions (novel) 1971 – made into a film, Gaġġa [Cage], directed by Mario Philip Azzopardi 1971 (KKM)
 Logħba Bejn Erbgħa [A Game Between Four People] 1972
 Samuraj [Samurai] 3 editions (novel) 1975 (KKM)
 Kristu fil-Poeżija Maltija 1913-1973 [Christ in Maltese Poetry 1913-1973] (originally a University of Malta dissertation, 1977, eventually published in 2018, large print edition, in the SPPDAA series)
 Fedra [Racine's Phèdre] 1978
 Il-Qtil fi Sqaq il-Ħorr [Murder in Honest Alley] (long short story) 1979 (SKS)
 Il-Proċess Vassalli [The Vassalli Trial] (play) 1980 
 Il-Mara tat-Tifel [Translation of D.H. Lawrence's Daughter in Law] (play) 1980
 Il-Mixja tal-Ħaddiem lejn il-Ħelsien [The Worker's March Towards Freedom] (political analysis) 1982 (SKS)
 Ir-Rivoluzzjoni Franċiża: il-Ġrajja u t-Tifsira [The French Revolution: History and Meaning] (history) 1989 (SKS)
 Paceville (novel) 1991 (Merlin)
 Letteratura [Literature] (ed. Toni Cortis) (literary criticism) 1992 (Ministeru tal-Edukazzjoni)
 Il-Ħakma ta' Monroj [Monroy's Rule] (folk opera, libretto) 1993
 Il-Ħolma Maltija [The Maltese Dream] (novel) 1994 (SKS), 2012 translated into Esperanto as La Malta Revo, published in New York, 2007
 Mannarinu! (folk opera, libretto) 1994
L-Atti tal-Appostli [The Acts of the Apostles] (folk opera, libretto) 1995
 Bonaparti f’Malta [Bonaparte in Malta] (history) 1997 (SKS), translated into French as Bonaparte à Malte, with an introduction by Dr Paul Borg Olivier, 2008 (Argo)
 Newbiet [Seasons] (short stories) 1998 (Illustrations: Giovanni Caselli) (Toni Cortis)
 Ħrejjef Żminijietna [Tales of Our Times] (short stories) 2000 (Illustrations: Giovanni Caselli) (SKS)
 Dun Ġorġ: Il-Bniedem tal-Poplu [Father George: a man of the people] (historical and religious theme) 2001 (SKS)
 Ġrajjet Ħaż-Żebbuġ [A History of Haz-Zebbug] (history) (translation of Dun Salv Ciappara's original) 2001 (Kazin 12 ta' Mejju)
 Lexicon (by Mikiel Anton Vassalli) 2002 (SKS)
 Għala Le għall-UE [Why No to the EU] (political analysis) 2003 (SKS)
 Ħarsa mill-qrib lejn ħajjet San Filep u l-Kult tiegħu [A Close Look at St Philip: His Life and the Devotion Towards Him](historical and religious theme) 2004 (Kazin 12 ta' Mejju)
 Ġrajjet it-Tagħlim f'Malta, Vol. 1 [The History of Education in Malta] (historical) 2004 (Familja Sammut)
 On The Da Vinci Code/Dwar The Da Vinci Code (literary criticism) 2006 (Argo)
 Għajdun il-Għaqal, Kliem il-Għerf u Qwiel Maltin [Maltese Axioms, Aphorisms and Proverbs] (translation of Mikiel Anton Vassalli's original) 2006 (Argo)
 I Giovanniti: La Storia dei Cavalieri di Malta [The History of the Knights of Malta] (history) 2006, published in 2015 (Bonfirraro Editore, Italy)
 Alfred Sant: Il-Viżjoni għall-Bidla [Alfred Sant: a vision for change] (political analysis) 2008 (SKS)
 Introduction to Baron Vincenzo Azopardi's dictionary in which he analyses Caxaro's "Cantilena" (literary criticism, linguistics) 2009 (Ghaqda tal-Malti - Università)
 Cagliostro: La doppia vita e l'intrigo maltese (history) 2017 (posthumous) (Bonfirraro Editore, Italy)

References

External links

 Premju Frans Sammut
 franssammut.info
 franssammut.com

1945 births
2011 deaths
Maltese male novelists
University of Perugia alumni
University of Malta alumni
People from Żebbuġ
Maltese non-fiction writers
20th-century Maltese novelists
21st-century Maltese novelists
Male non-fiction writers